Rodney Smith, Baron Smith (1914–1998), was a British surgeon. Baron Smith may also refer to:

Chris Smith, Baron Smith of Finsbury (born 1951)
Peter Smith, Baron Smith of Leigh (born 1945)
Philip Smith, Baron Smith of Hindhead (born 1966)
Robert Smith, Baron Smith of Kelvin (born 1944)
Trevor Smith, Baron Smith of Clifton (1937–2021)

See also
Anthony Hamilton-Smith, 3rd Baron Colwyn (born 1942)
Arthur Smith-Barry, 1st Baron Barrymore (1843–1925)
Charles Delacourt-Smith, Baron Delacourt-Smith (1917–1972)
Donald Smith, 1st Baron Strathcona and Mount Royal (1820–1914)
John Smith, Baron Kirkhill (born 1930)
Randal Smith, 2nd Baron Bicester (1898–1968)
Robert Dixon-Smith, Baron Dixon-Smith (born 1934)
Robert Smith, 1st Baron Carrington (1752–1838)
Vivian Smith, 1st Baron Bicester (1867–1956)
Lord Smith (disambiguation)